The 3rd Division is a Colombian National Army division based in the city of Cali consisting of four brigades: the 3rd Brigade based in Cali, the 8th Brigade based in Armenia, the 23rd Brigade based in Pasto and the 29th Brigade based in Popayán. The division is also supported by the 3rd Explosive Ordnance Disposal Group based in Cali.

Units

3rd Brigade 
 3rd Brigade HQ (Cali)
 3rd Mountain Infantry Battalion (Los Farallones)
 3rd Counterinsurgency Battalion (Cali)
 23rd Infantry Battalion (Cartago)
 3rd Brigade Training Battalion (Zarzal)
 3rd Military Police Battalion (Cali)
 3rd Artillery Battalion (Buga)
 3rd Engineer Battalion (Palmira)
 3rd Combat Service Support Battalion (Cali)
 Gaula Group “Valle” (Cali)

8th Brigade 
 8th Brigade HQ (Armenia)
 5th Mountain Infantry Battalion (Génova)
 22nd Infantry Battalion (Manizales)
 8th Brigade Training Battalion (Génova)
 8th Artillery Battalion (Pereira)
 8th Engineer Battalion (Pueblo Tapao)
 8th Combat Service Support Battalion (Armenia)
 Gaula Group “Risaralda” (Pereira)

23rd Brigade 
 29th Brigade HQ (Pasto)
 3rd Cavalry Group (Ipiales)
 9th Infantry Battalion (San Juan De Pasto)
 93rd Counterinsurgency Battalion (Pasto)
 23rd Brigade Training Battalion (Chapalito)
 Joint Task Force “Palmares” (Guaital)

29th Brigade 
 29th Brigade HQ (Popayán)
 4th Mountain Infantry Battalion (San Sebastián)
 7th Infantry Battalion (Popayán)
 8th Infantry Battalion (Cali)
 37th Counterinsurgency Battalion (Cali)
 29th Brigade Training Battalion
 29th Combat Service Support Battalion (Popayán)

Divisional Support

 3rd Explosive Ordnance Disposal Group (Cali)

External links
 3rd Division of the Colombian National Army

Divisions of the Colombian National Army